The 1953 Pepperdine Waves football team represented George Pepperdine College as a member of the California Collegiate Athletic Association (CCAA) during the 1953 college football season. The team was led by first-year head coach Gordon McEachron and played home games at El Camino Stadium on the campus of El Camino College in Torrance, California. They finished the season with an overall record of 3–6 and a mark of 2–3 in conference play, placing fourth in the CCAA.

On December 7, 1953, Pepperdine announced that they were withdrawing from the CCAA in order to "seek its own level" in the field of athletics.

Schedule

Notes

References

Pepperdine
Pepperdine Waves football seasons
Pepperdine Waves football